"Nebenbei" is a song by Swiss singer Luca Hänni. It was written by Hänni, Mathias Ramson, and Pille Hillebrand. The song was released on 20 December 2019 by Muve Recordings. It peaked at number 64 on the Swiss Singles Chart.

Background
The song is about his relationship with his girlfriend and how important it is to there for each other in good and bad times. It's totally different from his ESC song, but the song itself is even more powerful.

Track listing

Personnel
Credits adapted from Tidal.
 Mathias Ramson – Producer, composer, mixing engineer
 Luca Hänni – Composer

Charts

Release history

References

2019 singles
2019 songs
Luca Hänni songs
Songs written by Luca Hänni